Psaltica monochorda is a moth of the family Oecophoridae first described by Edward Meyrick in 1914. It is found in Sri Lanka.

References

Moths of Asia
Moths described in 1914
Oecophorinae